Meng Zhaojuan (born 14 December 1989) is a road and track cyclist, who most recently rode for UCI Women's Continental Team . Representing Hong Kong, Meng competed at the 2009, 2010, 2011 and 2015 UCI Track Cycling World Championships. Meng was born in Tongliao, Inner Mongolia, China, and moved to Hong Kong in 2006.

Major results

Road

2007
 7th Time trial, Asian Junior Road Championships
2011
 2nd Road race, National Road Championships
2012
 3rd Overall Tour of Zhoushan Island
1st Stage 2
 5th Road race, Asian Road Championships
2013
 3rd Road race, National Road Championships
 8th Overall Tour of Thailand
2014
 1st  Road race, National Road Championships
 1st Overall Tour of Thailand
1st Stages 2 & 3
2015
 1st  Road race, National Road Championships
 1st Overall The Princess Maha Chackri Sirindhon's Cup
1st  Points classification
1st Stage 3
 3rd  Road race, Asian Road Championships
 10th Overall Tour of Chongming Island
2016
 1st  Road race, National Road Championships
 9th Horizon Park Women Challenge
2017
 10th Road race, Asian Road Championships

Track

2011
 Asian Track Championships
3rd  Team pursuit
3rd  Team sprint
2014
 Hong Kong International Track Cup
1st Points race
1st Scratch
1st Team pursuit (with Pang Yao, Jamie Wong and Yang Qianyu)
2nd Keirin
2nd Sprint
3rd 500m time trial
 Track Clubs ACC Cup
2nd Keirin
2nd 500m time trial
3rd Sprint
 Hong Kong International Track Classic
2nd Keirin
2nd Sprint
 3rd  Team pursuit, Asian Track Championships (with Pang Yao, Jamie Wong and Yang Qianyu)
2015
 2nd  Team pursuit, Asian Track Championships (with Leung Bo Yee, Pang Yao and Yang Qianyu)
2016
 Track Asia Cup
1st Keirin
1st Team pursuit (with Leung Bo Yee, Leung Wing Yee and Pang Yao)
2nd Sprint
 3rd Sprint, Track Clubs ACC Cup
2017
 Asian Track Championships
1st  Madison (with Pang Yao)
3rd  Omnium

References

External links
 

1989 births
Hong Kong female cyclists
Living people
Cyclists at the 2010 Asian Games
Cyclists at the 2014 Asian Games
People from Tongliao
Cyclists from Inner Mongolia
Asian Games competitors for Hong Kong